ACV may refer to:

Companies and organizations
 Air Charter Service, UK, ICAO code ACV
 Asser Christelijke Voetbalvereniging, a Dutch amateur football club
 Associated Commercial Vehicles, a former vehicle manufacturer of the UK, acquired by Leyland Motors Ltd
 Confederation of Christian Trade Unions, a Belgian trade union

Economics
 Actual cash value, money equal to the cost of replacing lost, stolen, or damaged property after depreciation
 All-commodity volume, the total annual sales volume of retailers that can be aggregated from individual store-level up to larger geographical sets
 Asset of community value, in England, protection of land/property from development

Military
 Two Turkish armored combat vehicles:
 FNSS ACV-15
 FNSS ACV-19
Armoured Combat Vehicle, a proposed wheeled Canadian tank replacement

Amphibious Combat Vehicle, under development for the US Marine Corps
 Air Cushion Vehicle, a hovercraft used by the US Army in the Vietnam War

Other uses
 Achumawi language, the native language spoken by the Pit River people of present-day California
 Aciclovir, an antiviral drug
 Allegheny-Clarion Valley School District, a public school district in Clarion County, Pennsylvania, US
 Apple cider vinegar, a common vinegar available to consumers, popularly used in alternative medicine
 Arcata-Eureka Airport, McKinleyville, California, US, IATA code and FAA LID ACV
 Assassin's Creed Valhalla, a 2020 video game
 Hovercraft, also known as "air cushion vehicle", a type of vehicle supported by high pressure air
 δ-(L-α-amino-adipate)-L-cysteine-D-valine, the biological precursor of penicillin
 ACV, an astronomical notation for an Alpha2 Canum Venaticorum variable